Edi Bajrektarevič (born 15 January 1970) is a Slovenian retired international footballer who played as a defender.

Career
Bajrektarevič was capped once by the Slovenian national team, in 1999 against Greece.

References

External links
 Player profile at NZS 
 

1970 births
Living people
Slovenian footballers
Association football defenders
NK Celje players
NK Primorje players
ND Gorica players
NK Olimpija Ljubljana (1945–2005) players
Slovenian PrvaLiga players
Slovenia international footballers